The Syria national futsal team represents Syria in international futsal competitions and is controlled by the Syrian Arab Federation for Football, the governing body for futsal in Syria.

Tournament records

FIFA Futsal World Cup
 1989-2020 - Did not enter
 2024 - To be determined

AFC Futsal Championship

Futsal at the Asian Indoor and Martial Arts Games
 2005-2021 - Did not enter

WAFF Futsal Championship
 2007 - Did not enter
 2009 - 5th place
 2012 - Did not enter
 2022 - Did not enter

Mediterranean Futsal Cup
2010 - 13th place

Arab Futsal Championship
 1998-2007 - Did not enter 
 2008 - Group stage
 2021-2022 - Did not enter

North African Futsal Cup
 2009 - 4th

Zayed Arab University Futsal Championship
 2022 - Quarterfinals

Matches 
Here are all the matches of Syrian national futsal team

See also 
Syria national football team
Syria national under-23 football team
Syria national under-20 football team
Syria national under-17 football team
Syria women's national football team
Syrian Football Association
Football in Syria
Sport in Syria

References

 

Asian national futsal teams
Futsal
National